Sneh Rajya Laxmi Rana (28 February 1996) is a Nepalese sports shooter who competed for her country in the 2012 Summer Olympics.

References

External links
 

1994 births
Nepalese female sport shooters
Olympic shooters of Nepal
Shooters at the 2012 Summer Olympics
Living people
People from Rupandehi District
Shooters at the 2010 Asian Games
Shooters at the 2014 Asian Games
Asian Games competitors for Nepal
21st-century Nepalese women